MaltaToday is a twice-weekly English language newspaper published in Malta. Its first edition was published in 1999, and started out as a Friday newspaper.

History

MaltaToday was first published on Friday, 19 November 1999. It was edited by Saviour Balzan, and intended to provide an alternative to the English-language press in circulation,  such as the Times of Malta and the Malta Independent.

Initially published weekly on Fridays, the paper was then published on Sundays from 2001, with an additional Wednesday midweek paper being reintroduced in 2007.

The style of paper is liberal and pro-European, and is independent of political parties.

The sister Maltese-language paper Illum was first published in 2006.

In 2010, MaltaToday launched its internet news portal, and is the second most popular local news portal.

The current editorial lineup includes Matthew Vella as Executive Editor, with Saviour Balzan as Managing Editor. The online editor is Kurt Sansone.

References

External links 
Maltatoday.com.mt
Illum.com.mt

Newspapers published in Malta
Publications established in 1999
1999 establishments in Malta
Maltese news websites
English-language newspapers published in Europe